The 2012 Dublin Senior Football Championship was the inter club Gaelic football competition between the top teams in Dublin GAA. St Brigid's were the defending champions and Skerries Harps were the latest addition to the senior championship having won the Intermediate championship in 2011.

First round

The winners of the first-round games went on to the second round and were drawn against the other winners of the first round. The losers of the first round entered a losers section of the second round.

UCD, Ballyboden St Enda's, Raheny, St Oliver Plunkett's-Eoghan Ruadh, Skerries Harps, St Vincent's, St Peregrine's, Kilmacud Crokes, Trinity Gaels, Na Fianna, Ballymun Kickham's, St Patrick's Palmerstown, Parnells, Templeogue Synge Street, St Brigid's and Lucan Sarsfields all went on to qualify for the winners section of the second round of the Dublin Championship. St Mary's, Ballinteer St John's, Thomas Davis, St Anne's, St Jude's, Fingal Ravens, Naomh Mearnóg, St Maur's, Clontarf, St Mark's, Erin's Isle, St Sylvester's, O'Tooles and Round Towers Clondalkin all progressed to the second round losers section.

Whitehall Colmcille received a bye for the second round losers section and therefore avoided relegation, progressing to the third round of the Dublin Championship.

Ballyboden St. Enda's - BYE

Second round

The second round was divided into two sections, the losers and winners sections. The winning teams in the losers section went on to qualify for the third round of the championship while the losers of the losers section entered the relegation championship and the fight for their senior status. The losers of the winners section qualified for the third round and played the winners of the second round losers section. The winners of the winners section went on to qualify for the fourth round where they met the winners of the third round. UCD, Templeogue Synge Street and Na Fianna all progressed to the fourth round of the Dublin championship. 

Whitehall Colmcille get a BYE

Third round
The second round winners of the losers section were paired against the losers of the winners section for the third round of the championship. Lucan Sarsfields, St Peregrine's, Trinity Gaels, Whitehall Colmcille, St Mary's Saggart, Skerries Harps, Naomh Mearnóg and Raheny were knocked out of the Dublin championship in September 2012, to return in 2013.

Ballyboden St Enda's, Parnell's, Thomas Davis, St Pat's Palmerstown, St Maur's and Erin's Isle all won their respective third round ties and progressed to the fourth round stage of the competition.

Last Sixteen
The fourth round consists of the winners of the second round winners section who are drawn against the winners of the third round. This round consists of the last 16 remaining teams in the Dublin Championship for 2012. Second round winners UCD, Templeogue Synge Street, Na Fianna, St Vincent's, Ballymun Kickhams, St Oliver Plunkett's-Eoghan Ruadh, Kilmacud Crokes and St Brigid's were drawn against the third round winners Ballyboden St Enda's, Parnells, Thomas Davis, St Pat's Palmerstown, St Maur's, Erin's Isle, St Sylvester's and St Jude's. St Judes, Na Fianna, Ballymun Kickhams, St Brigid's, St Sylvester's, Templeogue Synge Street, Kilmacud Crokes and St Vincent's qualified for the quarter finals; St Oliver Plunkett's-Eoghan Ruadh, UCD, Erin's Isle, Parnell's, Thomas Davis, Ballyboden St Enda's, St Pat's Palmerstown and St Maur's were knocked out during round four.

Last Eight
The quarter finals of the Dublin Championship consisted of the eight winners of the fourth round. The games were to be played on the weekend of 14 October. The St Brigid's game was cancelled and rescheduled for 17 October 2012 due to the untimely death of Seamus Bonner. The Kilmacud Crokes was also brought forward to the 17th due to their hurling side appearing in the Dublin senior hurling championship final on the same weekend as 14 October. Na Fianna, St Sylvester's, Templeogue Synge Street and St Vincent's were knocked out at the quarter final stage. St Jude's, St Brigid's, Kilmacud Crokes and Ballymun Kickham's progressed to the last four of the competition.

Last Four

The Final

Relegation Championship
Each winning team in the relegation championship avoids potential relegation. The relegation championship works in the opposite way to a normal championship. It is the aim of each team to exit the relegation championship and the only way to do this is by beating the opposition. Only losing teams progress to the successive rounds of the relegation championship. Any team that remains a losing side for the entire duration of the championship can be relegated to the Dublin Intermediate Football Championship although, if the winners of the Intermediate championship already have a team in the senior championship, they are not promoted and no team is relegated. Although, in the case of 2012, no team will be relegated due to a decision to increase the Dublin senior football championship from 31 teams to 32 teams.

St Anne's, St Mark's, Clontarf, O'Toole's, Ballinteer St John's, Fingal Ravens and Round Towers Clondalkin were due to compete in the 2012 relegation championship but the games were cancelled.

References

External links
Dublin GAA Fixtures & Results

Dublin Senior Football Championship
Dublin Senior Football Championship